Shanavia Dowdell (born September 10, 1987) is an American professional basketball player for Declercq Stortbeton Waregem in Belgium. She played college basketball at Louisiana Tech. In her senior year, she recorded 22 double doubles (double digits for two statistical categories) which was the most among all players in Division I basketball. She was the third leading rebounder in the nation, averaging 12.4 per game.

Louisiana Tech statistics

Source

References

External links
Shanavia Dowdell Bio – La Tech Official Athletic Site

1987 births
Living people
American women's basketball players
Basketball players from Alabama
Forwards (basketball)
Louisiana Tech Lady Techsters basketball players
People from Calera, Alabama
Washington Mystics draft picks